Murazzano is a comune (municipality) in the Province of Cuneo in the Italian region Piedmont, located about  southeast of Turin and about  east of Cuneo.

Murazzano borders the following municipalities: Belvedere Langhe, Bonvicino, Bossolasco, Clavesana, Igliano, Marsaglia, Mombarcaro, Paroldo, San Benedetto Belbo, and Torresina. It is a center of robiola cheese production.

References

External links 
 Official website

Cities and towns in Piedmont